Stanovsky is a rural locality (a khutor) in Ryabovskoye Rural Settlement, Alexeyevsky District, Volgograd Oblast, Russia. The population was 56 as of 2010.

Geography 
Stanovsky is located 49 km southwest of Alexeyevskaya (the district's administrative centre) by road. Ryabovsky is the nearest rural locality.

References 

Rural localities in Alexeyevsky District, Volgograd Oblast